This article is a list of diseases of rye (Secale cereale).

Bacterial diseases

Fungal diseases

Nematodes, parasitic

Viral diseases

References
Common Names of Diseases, The American Phytopathological Society

Rye